Lybbe is a surname. Notable people with the surname include:

Richard Lybbe (1479–1527/28), English politician
Philip Lybbe Powys Lybbe (1818–1897), English rower, barrister, and politician